James Reece may refer to:

James Gordon Reece
Jimmy Reece
Reece James, football player

See also
James Reese (disambiguation)